Fructokinase (/fruc•to•ki•nase/ [-ki´nas]), also known as D-fructokinase or D-fructose (D-mannose) kinase, is an enzyme of the liver, intestine, and kidney cortex. Fructokinase is in a family of enzymes called transferases, meaning that this enzyme transfers functional groups; it is also considered a phosphotransferase (or, frequently, a kinase) since it specifically transfers a phosphate group. Fructokinase specifically catalyzes the transfer of a phosphate group from adenosine triphosphate (ATP, the substrate) to fructose as the initial step in its utilization. The main role of fructokinase is in carbohydrate metabolism, more specifically, sucrose and fructose metabolism. The reaction equation is as follows:

ATP + D-fructose → ADP + D-fructose 1-phosphate.

Role in plants and bacteria

Fructokinase has been characterized from various organisms such as pea (Pisum sativum) seeds, avocado (Persera americana) fruit, and maize (Zea mays) kernels, and many more.

Specifically, fructokinase may also regulate starch synthesis in conjunction with SS, sucrose synthase, which first metabolizes sink tissue in plant tissues such as in potatoes. There are also two divergent fructokinase genes that are differentially expressed and which also have different enzymatic properties such as those found in tomatoes. In tomatoes, fructokinase 1 (Frk 1) mRNA is expressed at a constant level during fruit development. However, fructokinase 2 (Frk 2) mRNA has a high expression level in young tomato fruit but then decreases during the later stages of fruit development. Frk 2 has a higher affinity for fructose than Frk 1 but Frk 2 activity is inhibited by high levels of fructose, whereas Frk 1 activity is not.

In Sinorhizobium meliloti, a common gram-soil bacterium, fructokinase is also used in the metabolism of mannitol and sorbitol, in addition to the metabolism of fructose.

Role in animals and humans

In human liver, purified fructokinase, when coupled with aldolase, has been discovered to contribute to an alternative mechanism to produce oxalate from xylitol. In coupled sequence, fructokinase and aldolase produce glycolaldehyde, a precursor to oxalate, from D-xylulose via D-xylulose 1-phosphate.

In rat liver cells (hepatocytes), GTP is also a substrate of fructokinase. It can be used at a substantial rate by fructokinase. In these isolated hepatocytes, in vivo, when the concentration of ATP falls to about 1 millimole in a short time interval, GTP becomes an important substrate under these specific conditions. Unlike phosphofructokinase, fructokinase is not inhibited by ATP.

Diseases

Fructosuria or hepatic fructokinase deficiency is a rare but benign inherited metabolic disorder. This condition is caused by a deficiency of fructokinase in the liver. Affected individuals usually display a large blood fructose concentration after the ingestion of fructose, sucrose or sorbitol. The disease is mainly characterized by the detection of the abnormal excretion of fructose in the urine through a urinalysis. Fructokinase is needed for the synthesis of glycogen, the body's form of stored energy, from fructose. The presence of fructose in the blood and urine may lead to an incorrect diagnosis of diabetes mellitus. Biochemical abnormalities that may lead to the eventual diagnosis of fructosuria are hepatic fructokinase deficiency, levulosuria and ketohexokinase deficiency.

See also
 Hepatic fructokinase
 PFKL
 PFKM
 PFKP
 Glucokinase
 Hexokinase

References

External links
 

EC 2.7.1